Baghestan (also Romanized as Bāghestān; also known as Bāghestān-e Ferdows, Bāghestān-e Olyā and Bāghestān-e Bālā) is a city in Eslamiyeh District of Ferdows County, South Khorasan province, Iran. At the 2006 census, its population was 2,044 in 628 households, when it was a village in the Central District. The following census in 2011 counted 2,467 people in 739 households. The latest census in 2016 showed a population of 2,704 people in 757 households.

After the census, Eslamiyeh District was established by combining Baghestan Rural District, Borun Rural District, and the city of Eslamiyeh. At the same time, Baghestan-e Olya's name changed to Baghestan and was raised to the level of a city. Baghestan-e Sofla became the new capital of Baghestan Rural District.

References 

Ferdows County

Cities in South Khorasan Province

Populated places in South Khorasan Province

Populated places in Ferdows County